Cymindis babaulti is a species of ground beetle in the subfamily Harpalinae. It was described by Andrewes in 1924.

References

babaulti
Beetles described in 1924